The Victorian Intercolonial Exhibition world's fair
was held in Melbourne, Colony of Victoria between 2 September and 16 November 1875.

Commission
The original commission comprised Sir Redmond Barry, acting chief justice; members of the Victorian Legislative Assembly (M.L.A.): J. J. Casey, J. F. Sullivan, C. J. Jennor, J. Munro; James Gatehouse (mayor of Melbourne); the former mayor J. McIlwraith; and J. I. Bleasdale.

And later the following became additional commissioners: John O'Shanassy (former premier of Victoria); James McCulloch, J. A. Macpherson, J.T. Smith, J. Bosisto (all M.L.A.s); S.H. Bindon; the Count de Castelnau;  L.J. Sherrard; and J. Danks. 
G. C. Levey who had experience with the Victorian Exhibition of 1872, and the London International and Vienna Exhibitions of 1873 was appointed secretary.

Location
The exhibition was held in the Public Library (as were earlier exhibitions in 1866 and 1872) along with a specially constructed 190 ft by 60 ft iron and wood building.

Contributors
There were exhibitors from the colonies of Victoria (805), New South Wales, South Australia, Tasmania (118) and Northern Territory (86), along with Singapore (2) and Japan (2).

Displays 

Displays included two beer exhibits from Yarra Bend Asylum,  three copper engraved maps of Victoria organised by Alexander John Skene and A C Allen and engraved by Slight and The Lord's Prayer in 50 different kinds of shorthand

The Victorian Academy of Arts organised the Fine Arts section which included paintings by Louis Buvelot, Eugene von Guerard, Isaac Whitehead and Henry Leonardus van den Houten.

Awards 

The awards given during the exhibition included the Intercolonial Exhibition medal.  648 medals were produced to be awarded to winning exhibitors in various categories. The medal included a latin inscription and was designed by prominent sculptor of the period, Charles Summers.

Closing
At the closing ceremony at noon on 16 November, Redmond Barry, chairman of the commissioners, addressing the acting governor William Stawell summarised the numbers of exhibitors, visitors and proceeds. He described jury selection and summarised medals awarded. He also thanked the jurors and the trustees of the Public Library and National Museum for the use of their great hall and annexes.

References

1875 establishments
1875 disestablishments in Australia
1875 in Australia
1870s in Melbourne
Colony of Victoria
World's fairs in Melbourne